Morris Rock is a rock outcropping that rises to  in the northwest extremity of the Aitcho group, English Strait in the South Shetland Islands, Antarctica.  The area was visited by early 19th century sealers.

The feature is named after Alfred Morris (b. 1890), draughtsman in the Admiralty Hydrographic Office in 1935.

Location

See also
 Aitcho Islands
 Composite Antarctic Gazetteer
 List of Antarctic islands south of 60° S
 SCAR
 South Shetland Islands
 Territorial claims in Antarctica

Maps
 L.L. Ivanov et al. Antarctica: Livingston Island and Greenwich Island, South Shetland Islands. Scale 1:100000 topographic map. Sofia: Antarctic Place-names Commission of Bulgaria, 2005.
 L.L. Ivanov. Antarctica: Livingston Island and Greenwich, Robert, Snow and Smith Islands. Scale 1:120000 topographic map.  Troyan: Manfred Wörner Foundation, 2009.

References
 SCAR Composite Antarctic Gazetteer.

External links
 SCAR Composite Antarctic Gazetteer.

Islands of the South Shetland Islands